Bwrdd Arthur (meaning "Arthur's Table"), also known as Din Sylwy, is a  flat-topped limestone hill on the island of Anglesey, in Wales. Located on the eastern end of Red Wharf Bay, some 3 kilometres north west of Llangoed, it is noteworthy from the evidence of pre-historic occupation and as a Site of Special Scientific Interest designated for its botanical interest.

The tiny medieval church of St Michael is on the eastern side of the hill fort.

Botany
The site has both calcareous heath and limestone exposures which between them support plant communities including  western gorse Ulex gallii, common rockrose Helianthemum nummularium, pale St. John's wort Hypericum montanum, Frog orchid  Coeloglossum viride, ivy broomrape Orobanche hederae and the nationally rare  hoary rockrose Helianthemum canum

Archaeology
The whole site, which is in private ownership, is a scheduled monument and is believed to have been occupied as a significant hill fort both before and during the Roman invasion

References

Llanddona
Hillforts in Anglesey
Mountains and hills of Anglesey
Sites of Special Scientific Interest on Anglesey
Scheduled monuments in Wales